Augustine Mary Moore Stack (7 December 1879 – 27 April 1929) was an Irish republican and politician who served as Minister for Home Affairs from 1921 to 1922. He was a Teachta Dála (TD) from 1918 to 1927.

Early life
Stack was born in Ballymullen, Tralee, County Kerry, to William Stack, an attorney's clerk, and Nanette O'Neill. He was educated at the Christian Brothers School in Tralee. At the age of fourteen, he left school and became a clerk in a solicitor's office. A gifted Gaelic footballer, he captained the Kerry team to All-Ireland victory in 1904. He also served as President of the Kerry Gaelic Athletic Association County Board.

Activism
He became politically active in 1908 when he joined the Irish Republican Brotherhood. In 1916, as commandant of the Kerry Brigade of the Irish Volunteers, he made preparations for the landing of arms by Roger Casement. He was made aware that Casement was arrested on Easter Saturday and was being held in Tralee. He made no attempt to rescue him from Ballymullen Barracks.

Stack was arrested and sentenced to death for his involvement in the Rising; however, this was later commuted to penal servitude for life. He was released under general amnesty in June 1917 and was elected as an abstentionist Sinn Féin MP for Kerry West at the 1918 Westminster election, becoming a member of the 1st Dáil. He was elected unopposed as an abstentionist member of the House of Commons of Southern Ireland and a member of the 2nd Dáil as a Sinn Féin TD for Kerry–Limerick West at the 1921 elections.

Stack, as part of his role as Minister for Home Affairs, is widely credited with the creation and administration of the Dáil Courts. These were courts run by IRA in parallel and opposition to the judicial system being run by the British government. The IRA and Sinn Féin was highly successful in both getting the civilian population of Ireland to use the courts and accept their rulings. The success of this initiative gave Sinn Féin a large boost in legitimacy and supported their goals in creating a "counter-state" within Ireland as part of their overarching goals in the War of Independence.

He opposed the Anglo-Irish Treaty of 1921, and took part in the subsequent Civil War. He was captured in 1923 and went on hunger strike for forty-one days before being released in July 1924.

Dáil
He was elected to the Third Dáil at the 1922 general election and subsequent elections as an Anti-Treaty Sinn Féin TD for the Kerry constituency. When Éamon de Valera founded Fianna Fáil in 1926, Stack remained with Sinn Féin being re-elected to the Dáil at the June 1927 general election. He did not contest the September 1927 general election.

Personal life
In 1925, he married Winifred (Una) Gordon, née Cassidy (died 1950), the widow of a Royal Irish Constabulary district inspector, Patrick Gordon (1870–1912).

Stack's health never recovered after his hunger strike and he died in a Dublin hospital on 27 April 1929, aged 49.

Honours
Austin Stack Park in his home town of Tralee, one of the Gaelic Athletic Association's stadiums, is named in his honour, as is the Austin Stacks GAA Hurling and Gaelic football club.

References

External links

1879 births
1929 deaths
All-Ireland-winning captains (football)
Early Sinn Féin TDs
Irish Republican Army (1919–1922) members
Irish Republican Army (1922–1969) members
Kerry inter-county Gaelic footballers
Members of the 1st Dáil
Members of the 2nd Dáil
Members of the 3rd Dáil
Members of the 4th Dáil
Members of the 5th Dáil
Members of the Irish Republican Brotherhood
Members of the Parliament of the United Kingdom for County Kerry constituencies (1801–1922)
Ministers for Justice (Ireland)
People from Tralee
People of the Irish Civil War (Anti-Treaty side)
Politicians from County Kerry
UK MPs 1918–1922
Politicians imprisoned during the Irish revolutionary period